John Dodge may refer to:

 John Wood Dodge (1807–1893), American painter.
 John Francis Dodge (1864–1920), American automobile pioneer
 John Dodge (baseball) (1889–1916), American third baseman in Major League Baseball
 Johnnie Dodge (1894–1960), British Army officer of both world wars and Great Escaper
 John Dodge (editor), American freelance writer and social media consultant
 John Dodge (paediatrician) (1933–2022), British consultant